The 2014 San Benedetto Tennis Cup is a professional tennis tournaments played on clay courts. It is the 10th edition of the tournament which is part of the 2014 ATP Challenger Tour, offering a total of €35,000+H in prize money. The event takes place in San Benedetto del Tronto, Italy, on 7 July to 13 July 2014.

Singles entrants

Seeds 

 1 Rankings as of 23 June 2014

Other entrants 
The following players received wildcards into the singles main draw:
  Simone Bolelli
  Alessandro Giannessi
  Gianluigi Quinzi
  Filippo Volandri

The following players entered as an alternate into the singles main draw:
  Gianluca Naso

The following players received entry from the qualifying draw:
  Duilio Beretta
  Tomislav Brkić
  Enzo Couacaud
  Artem Smirnov

Doubles main draw entrants

Seeds

1 Rankings as of June 24, 2014.

Champions

Singles 

  Damir Džumhur def.  Andreas Haider-Maurer 6–3, 6–3

Doubles 

  Daniele Giorgini /  Potito Starace def.  Hugo Dellien /  Sergio Galdós 6–3, 6–7(3–7), [10–5]

External links 
  

2014 ATP Challenger Tour
2014
2014 in Italian tennis